Elections to Wiltshire County Council were held on 1 May 1997.  The whole council was up for election and the result was no overall control, with the Conservatives as the largest party.

As with other county elections in England, these local elections in Wiltshire took place on the same day as the 1997 United Kingdom general election.

Results

|}

Results by divisions

Aldbourne and Ramsbury

Alderbury

Amesbury

Avon and Cannings

Bedwyn and Pewsey

Bourne Valley

Bradford on Avon

Bremhill and Calne

Calne

Chippenham Park

Chippenham Sheldon

Chippenham Town

Collingbourne

Corsham

Cricklade and Purton

Devizes

Devizes South and Bromham

Downton

Durrington

Holt

Kington

Lavington

Malmesbury

Marlborough

Melksham

Melksham Without

Mere

Minety

Pickwick with Box

Salisbury Bemerton

Salisbury Harnham

Salisbury St Mark

Salisbury St Martin

Salisbury St Paul

Southwick

Tisbury

Trowbridge East

Trowbridge South

Trowbridge West

Upper Wylye Valley

Warminster East

Warminster West

Westbury

Whorwellsdown Hundred

Wilton and Wylye

Wootton Bassett North

Wootton Bassett South

By-elections between 1997 and 2001

References

Wiltshire County Council Diary 1997/8 (Trowbridge: Wiltshire County Council, 1997, pp. 5–11 
Horsey, John (Returning Officer), Declarations of results for West Wiltshire county divisions, 1 May 1997

External links
Colin Rallings, Michael Thrasher, Wiltshire County Council election Results 1973–2005 at electionscentre.co.uk
Results for Aldbourne and Ramsbury at wiltshire.gov.uk
Results for Alderbury at wiltshire.gov.uk
Results for Amesbury at wiltshire.gov.uk
Results for Avon and Cannings at wiltshire.gov.uk
Results for Bedwyn & Pewsey at wiltshire.gov.uk
Results for Bourne Valley at wiltshire.gov.uk
Results for Bradford on Avon at wiltshire.gov.uk
Results for Bremhill and Calne at wiltshire.gov.uk 
Results for Calne at wiltshire.gov.uk 
Results for Chippenham Park at wiltshire.gov.uk
Results for Chippenham Sheldon at wiltshire.gov.uk
Results for Chippenham Town at wiltshire.gov.uk
Results for Collingbourne at wiltshire.gov.uk
Results for Corsham at wiltshire.gov.uk
Results for Cricklade and Purton at wiltshire.gov.uk
Results for Devizes at wiltshire.gov.uk
Results for Devizes South and Bromham at wiltshire.gov.uk
Results for Downton at wiltshire.gov.uk
Results for Durrington at wiltshire.gov.uk
Results for Holt at wiltshire.gov.uk
Results for Kington at wiltshire.gov.uk
Results for Lavington at wiltshire.gov.uk
Results for Malmesbury at wiltshire.gov.uk
Results for Marlborough at wiltshire.gov.uk
Results for Melksham at wiltshire.gov.uk
Results for Melksham Without at wiltshire.gov.uk
Results for Mere at wiltshire.gov.uk
Results for Minety at wiltshire.gov.uk
Results for Pickwick and Box at wiltshire.gov.uk
Results for Salisbury Bemerton at wiltshire.gov.uk
Results for Salisbury Harnham at wiltshire.gov.uk
Results for Salisbury St Mark at wiltshire.gov.uk
Results for Salisbury St Martin at wiltshire.gov.uk
Results for Salisbury St Paul at wiltshire.gov.uk
Results for Southwick at wiltshire.gov.uk
Results for Tisbury at wiltshire.gov.uk
Results for Trowbridge East at wiltshire.gov.uk
Results for Trowbridge South at wiltshire.gov.uk
Results for Trowbridge West at wiltshire.gov.uk
Results for Upper Wylye Valley at wiltshire.gov.uk
Results for Warminster East at wiltshire.gov.uk
Results for Warminster West at wiltshire.gov.uk
Results for Westbury at wiltshire.gov.uk
Results for Whorwellsdown at wiltshire.gov.uk
Results for Wilton and Wylye at wiltshire.gov.uk
Results for Wootton Bassett North at wiltshire.gov.uk
Results for Wootton Bassett South at wiltshire.gov.uk

1997
1997 English local elections
1990s in Wiltshire